The Mason City Micropolitan Statistical Area, as defined by the United States Census Bureau, is an area consisting of two counties in north central Iowa, anchored by the city of Mason City.

As of the 2000 census, the area had a population of 54,356 (though a July 1, 2009 estimate placed the population at 51,150).

Counties
Cerro Gordo
Worth

Communities

Places with more than 25,000 inhabitants
Mason City (Principal city)

Places with 1,000 to 10,000 inhabitants
Clear Lake
Manly
Nora Springs (partial)
Northwood
Rockwell

Places with less than 1,000 inhabitants
Dougherty
Fertile
Grafton
Hanlontown
Joice
Kensett
Meservey
Plymouth 
Rock Falls
Rockford
Swaledale
Thornton
Ventura

Unincorporated places
Bolan

Townships

Cerro Gordo County

 Bath
 Clear Lake
 Dougherty
 Falls
 Geneseo
 Grant
 Grimes
 Lake

 Lime Creek
 Lincoln
 Mason
 Mount Vernon
 Owen
 Pleasant Valley
 Portland
 Union

Worth County

 Barton
 Bristol
 Brookfield
 Danville
 Deer Creek
 Fertile

 Grove
 Hartland
 Kensett
 Lincoln
 Silver Lake
 Union

Demographics
As of the census of 2000, there were 54,356 people, 22,652 households, and 14,664 families residing within the μSA. The racial makeup of the μSA was 96.57% White, 0.73% African American, 0.16% Native American, 0.62% Asian, 0.02% Pacific Islander, 0.81% from other races, and 1.10% from two or more races. Hispanic or Latino of any race were 2.60% of the population.

The median income for a household in the μSA was $36,156, and the median income for a family was $43,931. Males had a median income of $29,859 versus $21,339 for females. The per capita income for the μSA was $18,068.

See also
Iowa census statistical areas

References

 
Geography of Cerro Gordo County, Iowa
Geography of Worth County, Iowa
Mason City, Iowa